Ana Casas may refer to:

 Ana Casas Broda (born 1965), Mexican photographer
 Ana María Casas (born 1955), Mexican gymnast
 Ana Teresa Casas (born 1991), Mexican cyclist